Moss Bluff is a census-designated place (CDP) in Calcasieu Parish, Louisiana, United States. The population was 12,522 at the 2020 census. Located just north of the city of Lake Charles, it is considered a suburb of that city. Moss Bluff is a burgeoning community, and is one of the communities in Calcasieu Parish besides Lake Charles and Sulphur experiencing growth.  Several efforts have been made to incorporate Moss Bluff, but at the present time the community is unincorporated.

Geography
Moss Bluff is located at  (30.310003, -93.204753).

Moss Bluff is intersected by U.S. Highway 171 and Louisiana Highway 378.

Demographics

As of the 2020 United States census, there were 12,522 people, 4,163 households, and 3,061 families residing in the CDP. There were 4,163 households, out of which 28.3% had children under the age of 18 living with them, 67.0% were married couples living together, 11.0% had a female householder with no husband present, and 18.7% were non-families. 15.5% of all households were made up of individuals, and 5.3% had someone living alone who was 65 years of age or older. The average household size was 2.84 and the average family size was 3.16.

In the CDP, the population was spread out, with 29.9% under the age of 18, 9.0% from 18 to 24, 31.1% from 25 to 44, 22.1% from 45 to 64, and 7.8% who were 65 years of age or older. The median age was 34 years. For every 100 females, there were 95.9 males. For every 100 females age 18 and over, there were 93.6 males.

The median income for a household in the CDP was $60,588, and the median income for a family was $54,137. Males had a median income of $41,226 versus $22,327 for females. The per capita income for the CDP was $25,766. About 7.3% of families and 8.3% of the population were below the poverty line, including 9.7% of those under age 18 and 12.5% of those age 65 or over.

Culture

Moss Bluff is the home of Sam Houston Jones State Park, a protected natural park of the state.

Former Louisiana State Representative Vic Stelly, author of the Stelly Plan, resides in Moss Bluff, as does Stelly's successor in the House, businessman Brett Geymann.

Notable residents 
David Filo, Businessman and Co-Founder of Yahoo.

Ralph Eggleston, Academy Award winning Art Director of Toy Story, Finding Nemo, Monsters, Inc.

Education
Moss Bluff's elementary and middle schools maintain some of the highest student populations in Calcasieu Parish. The single Moss Bluff high school, Sam Houston High School, competes in the Louisiana High School Athletic Association Class AAAAA.

References

External links 
The Moss Bluff Gazette

Census-designated places in Calcasieu Parish, Louisiana
Census-designated places in Louisiana
Census-designated places in Lake Charles metropolitan area